Knoll (previously Knoll Inc., now a subsidiary MillerKnoll, Inc.), is an American company that manufactures office systems, seating, storage systems, tables, desks, textiles, as well as accessories for the home, office, and higher education. The company is the licensed manufacturer of furniture designed by notable architects and designers such as David Adjaye, Harry Bertoia, Ludwig Mies van der Rohe, Florence Knoll, Frank Gehry, Charles Gwathmey, Maya Lin, Marc Newson, Ini Archibong, Eero Saarinen, and Lella and Massimo Vignelli, under the company's KnollStudio division. Over 40 Knoll designs can be found in the permanent design collection of the Museum of Modern Art in New York City.

History 
The company was founded in New York City in 1938 by Hans Knoll. Production facilities were moved to Pennsylvania in 1950. After the death of Hans in 1955, his wife Florence Knoll took over as head of the company. The company is headquartered in East Greenville, Pennsylvania and has manufacturing sites in North America (East Greenville, Grand Rapids, Muskegon, and Toronto) and Italy (Foligno and Graffignana).

In 2011, Knoll received the National Design Award for Corporate and Institutional Achievement from the Cooper Hewitt, Smithsonian Design Museum.

The acquisition of Knoll by Herman Miller was announced in April 2021 in a $1.8 billion deal.  The merger closed in the third quarter of 2021. The merged company is listed on the Nasdaq Stock Market and trades under the symbol: MLKN.

In July 2021, the company was rebranded as "MillerKnoll".

Notable designers
Many noteworthy designers have done work for Knoll, including:

Significant products 
Many of the company's products are included in museum collections, such as the Cooper-Hewitt, National Design Museum.
 In 1948, Eero Saarinen designed the womb chair

 In 1956, the company commissioned Eero Saarinen to design the Tulip chair for production.
 Following production of the tulip chair, the tulip table was designed by Saarinen. 
 In 1953, the company was accorded exclusive manufacturing and sales rights to Ludwig Mies van der Rohe furniture, including the Barcelona chair designed in collaboration with Lilly Reich for the 1929 Barcelona Pavilion. 
 The company holds production rights to the Wassily Chair by Marcel Breuer.
 In 1947, Knoll acquired exclusive U.S. production rights of the Hardoy chair ("Butterfly chair") by Jorge Ferrari-Hardoy. Cheaper imitations flooded the market. Knoll took legal action in 1950, in the end losing their claim of copyright infringement; the model was dropped in 1951. In 2018, Knoll rereleased a 100th anniversary tribute to the Butterfly Chair.

Gallery

Architecture preservation 
Knoll sponsors exhibitions, scholarships, and other activities related to Modernist architecture and design. In 2006, Knoll and the World Monuments Fund, a New York-based non-profit organization, launched Modernism at Risk, an advocacy and conservation program. Modernism at Risk encourages design solutions for at risk Modernist buildings, provides funding for conservation projects, and raises awareness of the threats to Modernist architecture through exhibitions and lectures.

The World Monuments Fund/Knoll Modernism Prize is awarded every two years to projects that preserve Modernist architecture.

In 2008, the first Knoll Modernism award was given to Winfried Brenne and Franz Jaschke of the German firm Brenne Gesellschaft von Architekten for the restoration of the former ADGB Trade Union School building on the outskirts of Berlin. The school, built between 1928 and 1930, was a project of the Bauhaus design school. The architects were Hannes Meyer, then director of the Bauhaus, and Hans Wittwer.

The 2010 prize went to Hubert-Jan Henket and Wessel de Jonge, the founders of Docomomo International, for the restoration of Zonnestraal Sanatorium (estate) in Hilversum, The Netherlands. 
The 2012 prize was given to a consortium of Japanese architects and academics for the restoration of the 1950s Hizuchi Elementary School on Shikoku island, Japan.

Similar companies
 Global Furniture Group
 Haworth
 Herman Miller
 Steelcase
 Vitra (furniture)

References

Further reading

External links 

 
 Knoll International
 World Monuments Fund / Knoll Modernism Prize 2008 brochure (pdf)

Industrial design firms
Furniture companies of the United States
Design companies of the United States
Companies formerly listed on the New York Stock Exchange
Manufacturing companies based in Pennsylvania
Companies based in Montgomery County, Pennsylvania
1938 establishments in New York City
American companies established in 1938
Manufacturing companies established in 1938
2021 mergers and acquisitions